Machiques is a city in Zulia State, Venezuela, located in the northwest portion of the country. It is close to the border with Colombia, and the area's main economic activity is cattle raising.  On 16 August 2005 West Caribbean Airways Flight 708, en route from Panama City to Fort-de-France, stalled and crashed in a mountainous area of the municipality, killing all 160 people on board.

Transport 

It is proposed that the city receive a railway station on the new national railway network.

See also 
 Railway stations in Venezuela

References 

 
Cities in Zulia